"Sugar/Tzu" is a song by English rock band Black Midi, released in 2022 as the third single from their third studio album, Hellfire. The song tells the story of a futuristic boxing match wherein one of the contenders is assassinated by a young boy. It was released with a music video directed by Noel Paul that went on to win "Best Cinematography in a Video" at the 2022 UK Music Video Awards.
A live recording of the song at Electrical Audio was released on flexi disc and bundled with copies of Hellfire sold in independent record stores in the United States.

Composition and lyrics 
"Sugar/Tzu" is a jazz fusion song featuring elements of post-punk and math rock, with Uncut describing it as "veering from tender and gentle restraint to volatile and discordant bursts of squealing guitar and drums."

The song's narrative came from lead vocalist and guitarist Geordie Greep's love of boxing, feeling that the sport was "the closest thing to the thrill of listening to music." In a press release, he highlighted the themes of violence and spectacle in the song:

Critical reception
Tyler Golsen, writing for Far Out Magazine, said of the song "[it provokes] a visceral response from listeners, whether positive or negative, but that power is something they never wield lightly. This is music that slaps you in the face and commands your full attention." The Fader placed "Sugar/Tzu" at number 30 on their list "The 100 Best Songs of 2022". Atwood Magazine placed it on their own year-end list as well, with Andrew Daly saying of the song and Hellfire "this record is the Trout Mask Replica for the modern era. Heavy praise, to be sure, but well-deserved nonetheless."

Personnel
 Geordie Greep – vocals, Yamaha SA60, Burns Double 6, Espana CS-40, Gibson Dove, Bechstein Grand Piano, Rhodes 54, optigan, accordian, horn arrangement
 Cameron Picton – Rickenbacker 4003, Hofner Senator Bass, Arturia Pigments, Arturia Synthi, marxophone, xylophone, flute, crowd noise 
 Morgan Simpson – Ludwig Vistalite Kit, percussion (tambourines, salt shaker, guiro, clave, cowbell) 
 Kaidi Akinnibi – Soprano saxophone, baritone saxophone, tenor saxophone
 Joe Bristow – trombone
 Ife Ogunjobi – trumpet
 Hus Ragip - boxing announcer

References

2022 songs
2022 singles
Black Midi songs
Rough Trade Records singles
British progressive rock songs